The CH-Type was a 90° V6 engine developed by Renault-Gordini for Renault's autosport activities. This François Castaing design was the predecessor of the famous EF series.

In 1972, after an agreement was reached with Elf, François Castaing, technical director of Renault Gordini, was given the go-ahead to build a 2-litre engine that could be used in a "sports" model and then in Formula 2.
His team opted for a 90° V6, which was released in 1973 and was named the "type CH1" in honour of Claude Haardt, who had died in an accident a few months earlier.

Engines

CH1

1973-1977
CH1 (N/A):  Bore x stroke 
 @ 9,800 rpm (1973),  @ 10,500 rpm (1977)

This V6 engine with four overhead camshafts and four valves per cylinder would prove highly successful.
Its record reads as follows:
European 2-litre Sports-Prototype Champion 1974, winning all seven races and the top three spots in the championship standings with the Alpine A441.
European Formula 2 Champion 1976 with Elf 2, which notched up four race wins, four pole positions and six podium finishes in 12 races.
European Formula 2 Champion 1977 with Martini MK 22, which amassed five race wins, two pole positions and six podium finishes
in 13 races.
A total of 14 race wins and eight podium finishes in 23 races in three seasons of 2-litre sportsprototype racing (1973-75) with the Alpine A 440 and A 441.
A total of 14 race wins, 10 pole positions and 20 podium finishes in 25 Formula 2 races in the 1976 and 1977 seasons, with the Elf 2 and Martini MK 19 and MK 22.

CHS

1975-1978
CHS (Turbo):  Bore x stroke 
 @ 9,500 rpm (1975-1978)

Used for the 1975 and 1976 World Championship for Makes and the 1977 and 1978 Le Mans 24 Hours, this engine fully accomplished its second goal, with:
One victory and five podium finishes in the 1975 and 1976 championships with the Alpine A441T and A442.
Second place in the 1977 Le Mans 24 Hours with a Mirage GR8.
Victory in the 1978 Le Mans 24 Hours with the Alpine A442 B.

CHS 2

1975-1978
CHS 2 (Turbo):  Bore x stroke 
/ @ 9,500 rpm (1978)

CH
Gasoline engines by model
V6 engines